Edoardo Stochino (born 5 November 1987) is an Italian marathon swimmer who won a bronze medal in the 25 km race at the 2014 European Aquatics Championships.

References

1987 births
Living people
Italian male freestyle swimmers
Italian male swimmers
Italian male long-distance swimmers
Swimmers of Fiamme Oro
21st-century Italian people